Before the Flood is a live album by American singer-songwriter Bob Dylan and the Band, released on June 20, 1974, on Asylum Records in the United States and Island Records in the United Kingdom. It was Dylan's first live album, although live recordings of earlier performances would later be released. It is the 15th album by Dylan and the seventh by the Band, and documents their joint 1974 American tour.

Content
Dylan and his new record label Asylum had planned professional recordings before the tour began, ten separate sessions in total: three in New York at Madison Square Garden on January 30 and 31; two in Seattle, at the Seattle Center Coliseum on February 9; two in Oakland, California, at the Alameda County Coliseum on February 11; and three in Los Angeles on February 13 and 14. To compile the album, recordings were taken from the final three shows at the Los Angeles Forum in Inglewood, California, with only "Knockin' on Heaven's Door" from New York.

The title of the album is thought to derive from the novel Farn Mabul by Yiddish writer Sholem Asch; Dylan had a personal relationship with Moses Asch, son of Sholem and founder of Folkways Records, a record label hugely influential in the folk music revival. Another theory is that the title refers to the album arriving before the inevitable flood of bootlegs could saturate the underground market.

Dylan and the Band had recorded the studio album Planet Waves prior to the tour.  In "Wedding Song", the final recording on the album, He sings, "We can't regain what went down in the flood".  Few of the album's songs were incorporated into the tour's setlist, and none are represented on Before the Flood. After the double album release, Dylan signed a new contract with Columbia Records in time for his next studio album, Blood on the Tracks, after returning label president Goddard Lieberson made a determined campaign to get Dylan back from Asylum. The Band continued to record on their own for Capitol Records.

Subsequent reissues were on the Columbia imprint, and on March 31, 2009, a remastered digipak version of Before the Flood was issued by Legacy Recordings/Columbia, now part of Sony Music Entertainment.

Critical reception

In a contemporary review for Creem magazine, Robert Christgau felt that the Band followed Dylan in intensifying his old songs for the arena venue and stated, "Without qualification, this is the craziest and strongest rock and roll ever recorded. All analogous live albums fall flat." In a less enthusiastic review, Rolling Stone magazine's Tom Nolan said Dylan's vocal emphasis and the Band's busy arrangements make for an awkward listen, although revamped versions of songs such as "It's All Right, Ma", "Like a Rolling Stone", and "All Along the Watchtower" are successful and sound meaningful. Before the Flood was voted the sixth best album of 1974, in The Village Voices annual Pazz & Jop critics poll. Christgau, the poll's creator, ranked it second on his own list.

In a retrospective review, Greg Kot of the Chicago Tribune called the album "epochal", while AllMusic's Stephen Thomas Erlewine described it as "one of the best live albums of its time. Ever, maybe." Greil Marcus commented, "Roaring with resentment and happiness, the music touched rock and roll at its limits." By contrast, Dylan himself later disparaged the tour, feeling that it was overblown. "I think I was just playing a role on that tour, I was playing Bob Dylan and the Band were playing the Band. It was all sort of mindless. The only thing people talked about was energy this, energy that. The highest compliments were things like, 'Wow, lotta energy, man.' It had become absurd." In a retrospective review, Scott Hreha from PopMatters also felt that each act did not sound collaborative as on The Basement Tapes and that the album "remains a worthy but inessential item in Dylan's catalog—and both he and the Band have better live recordings available, especially the several volumes in Dylan's Bootleg Series."

Track listing
Sides one and four are performances by Bob Dylan backed by the Band; side two and tracks four through six on side three are by the Band; tracks one through three on side three by Dylan alone. "Blowin' in the Wind" is a splice of two separate performances.

Personnel

Musicians
 Bob Dylan – vocals, guitars, harmonica, piano
 Robbie Robertson – electric guitar, backing vocals
 Garth Hudson – organ, piano, clavinet
 Levon Helm – vocals, drums
 Richard Manuel – vocals, piano, electric piano, organ, drums
 Rick Danko – vocals, bass guitar

Production
Rob Fraboni – recording engineer, mixing engineer
Phil Ramone – recording engineer
Nat Jeffrey – mixing engineer
Barry Feinstein – photography, design
Village Recorders – mixing location
Kendun Recorders – mastering location
Jeff Rosen – reissue producer
Steve Berkowitz – reissue producer
Location Recording by Wally Heider Recording,
Recording Crew: Ed Barton, Bill Broms, Jack Crymes,
Biff Dawes and Deane Jensen.

Certifications

References

External links
 

1974 live albums
Asylum Records live albums
Bob Dylan live albums
CBS Records live albums
Collaborative albums
Columbia Records live albums
Island Records live albums
The Band live albums
Albums recorded at the Forum